Manuel Costa (born 11 October 1921) was a Spanish professional road racing cyclist. He held the red leader's jersey for twelve days during the 1946 Vuelta a España, ultimately finishing in fourth place. He had a similar feat the following edition, where he finished second in the overall standings, after eleven days in the lead.

Major results
1943
 4th Overall Volta a Catalunya
1st Stage 2
1946
 4th Overall Vuelta a España
1947
 2nd Overall Vuelta a España
1948
 3rd Overall Volta a Tarragona
1st Stage 2
 6th Overall Vuelta a España

References

External links

1921 births
Possibly living people
Spanish male cyclists
Spanish Vuelta a España stage winners
People from Alt Penedès
Sportspeople from the Province of Barcelona
Cyclists from Catalonia
20th-century Spanish people